Ellison Tsang Yi Hang (born 27 October 2003) is a Hong Kong professional footballer who currently plays for Hong Kong Premier League club Kitchee.

Career statistics

Club

Notes

References

Living people
2003 births
Hong Kong footballers
Hong Kong youth international footballers
Association football defenders
Association football midfielders
Kitchee SC players